Micrixalus thampii is a frog species in the family Micrixalidae. It is endemic to the Western Ghats in India and to date recorded only in Silent Valley National Park.

Its natural habitats are subtropical or tropical moist lowland forests and rivers.

References

Micrixalus
Endemic fauna of the Western Ghats
Frogs of India
Amphibians described in 1981
Taxonomy articles created by Polbot